Snapdocs, Inc. is an American real estate technology company headquartered in San Francisco, California.  The company helps the many participants in a real estate closing work together better through integration and automation.

History
Snapdocs was founded in 2012 by Aaron King, a real estate industry veteran who became a licensed notary when he turned 18. King then founded NotaryLink to focus on modernizing the real estate closing process at the age of 21.  Two years after launch, Snapdocs took part in the Winter 2014 class of Y Combinator, a Silicon Valley accelerator that provides seed funding for startups. In October 2020, Snapdocs raised $60 million in a series C round of funding, bringing its total funds raised to $103 million. In May of 2021, Snapdocs raised an additional $150MM.

Products
Snapdocs’ offerings focus on workflow tools that digitize and automate tasks for lenders, title companies, and notaries.  The company also built and curates a database of over 80,000 notaries and real estate attorneys, who are rated and ranked according to user reviews and credentials. In addition to providing scheduling tools, its collaboration platform connects all parties along the mortgage chain and allows the transfer of loan documents and closing details. Snapdocs also automates mortgage vendor compensation for lenders, title and escrow companies.

Snapdocs facilitates over 100,000 real estate closings per month.

References

Mortgage industry companies of the United States